Guðmundsdóttir is a surname of Icelandic origin, meaning daughter of Guðmundur. In Icelandic names, the name is not strictly a surname, but a patronymic. The name may refer to:

Björk Guðmundsdóttir (born 1965), full name of Icelandic art-pop musician Björk
Fríða Dís Guðmundsdóttir (born 1987), Icelandic musician and blues singer
Rannveig Guðmundsdóttir (born 1940), Icelandic politician; government minister; member of the Althing (1989–2007)
Svava Rós Guðmundsdóttir (born 1995), Icelandic footballer

See also
Guðmundsson

Icelandic-language surnames
Patronymic surnames